Phantasies is an album by the American jazz pianist Jaki Byard with the Apollo Stompers, recorded in 1984 and released on the Italian Soul Note label.

Reception

The AllMusic review by Scott Yanow awarded the album 2½ stars stating, "This outing by Jaki Byard's big band The Apollo Stompers does not quite live up to its potential... The real reason to acquire this admittedly spirited set is for the occasional (and always notable) piano solos". The Penguin Guide to Jazz concluded that, "although well produced and more than adequately executed, the album drifts towards pastiche and pointless eclepticism."

Track listing
 "I May Be Wrong (But I Think You're Wonderful)" (Henry Sullivan) - 2:49 
 "Medley: Black and Tan Fantasy/Prelude No. 29/Prelude to a Kiss/Do Nothing till You Hear from Me" (Duke Ellington, Bubber Miley/Ellington, Irving Mills/Ellington) - 8:57 
 "One Note to My Wife" (Jaki Byard) - 3:15 
 "5/4 Medley: Take Five/Cinco Quatro Boogie Woogie/Take Five" (Paul Desmond/Byard/Desmond) - 6:12 
 "Medley: Lonely Woman/So What/Impressions/Olean Visit/Some Other Spring" (Ornette Coleman/Miles Davis/John Coltrane/Byard/Irene Kitchings, Arthur Herzog, Jr.) -  8:01 
 "It's Too Late" (Carole King) - 3:16 
 "Tricotism" (Oscar Pettiford) - 4:27 
 "Lover Man" (Jimmy Davis, Ram Ramirez, James Sherman) - 5:37 
Recorded at Vanguard Studios in New York City on September 25 & 26, 1984

Personnel
Jaki Byard – piano
Roger Parrot, Al Bryant, John Eckert, Jim White - trumpet
Steve Wienberg, Steve Swell, Carl Reinlib, Bob Norden - trombone
Stephen Calia - bass trombone
Bob Torrente, Manny Boyd - alto saxophone
Jed Levy, Alan Givens - tenor saxophone
Preston Trombly - baritone saxophone
Dan Licht - guitar
Ralph Hamperian - bass
Richard Allen - drums
Deynce Byard, Diane Byard - vocals, tambourine

References

Black Saint/Soul Note albums
Jaki Byard albums
1984 albums